Lucky Chan-sil is a 2019 South Korean romantic drama and fantasy film written and directed by Kim Cho-hee. It stars Kang Mal-geum in the titular role, alongside Youn Yuh-jung, Kim Young-min, Yoon Seung-ah and Bae Yoo-ram. The film was released in theaters on March 5, 2020.

Plot
Lee Chan-sil is a film producer who becomes jobless after the director she has worked with for years suddenly dies. She starts working as a cleaning lady for an actress and meets her new employer's French teacher. She is immediately attracted to him but she is held back by her life problems. Chan-sil realizes old anxieties are about to emerge: her already gone-youth, messed-up love life, and broken career.

Cast

Main
 Kang Mal-geum as Lee Chan-sil
 Youn Yuh-jung as Grandmother
 Kim Young-min as Jang Gook-young
 Yoon Seung-ah as Sophie
 Bae Yoo-ram as Kim-young

Special appearances
 Choi Hwa-jung as Representative Park
 Lee Young-jin as an actress
 Seo Sang-won as Director Ji

Release
The film had its world premiere at the 24th Busan International Film Festival on October 8, 2019 and was released in South Korean theaters on March 5, 2020.

It was screened at the 15th Osaka Asian Film Festival on March 9 and 14, 2020.

The North American premiere of the film was scheduled to be held at the 63rd San Francisco International Film Festival on April 16 and 18, 2020 before the festival was canceled due to the COVID-19 pandemic.

The film was invited to compete at the 22nd Udine Far East Film Festival which was postponed from April 24 – May 2 to June 26 – July 4 due to the COVID-19 pandemic.

Reception

Critical response
Marc Raymond of Senses of Cinema said that "The self-reflexive style risks making the film just an in-joke exercise, but it is kept afloat by the genuine existential sadness of the lead character, who has devoted her life to her work in cinema, forsaking marriage and children, and is left doubting her life choices and wondering if she could perhaps change course."

Accolades

References

External links
 
 
 

2019 films
2010s Korean-language films
2019 romantic drama films
2019 fantasy films
South Korean romantic drama films
South Korean fantasy films
South Korean independent films
2010s South Korean films
2019 independent films